Shinhan Card Co. Ltd. is Korea's biggest, global top-five credit card company. Headquartered in Seoul, South Korea, the company has a partnership with Shinhan Capital, and is an affiliate of Shinhan Financial Group. Shinhan Card was established in 1990 as a technical and business company licensed by Shinhan Bank. It introduced the technology of sending virtual one-time card numbers in Visa's 3-D Secure first in the world for its customers' security.

Brand
Shinhan Card both issues credit card and check card and also operate under a BC Card license inherited from Chohung Bank.

In the United States, most card readers will accept as Debit Mastercard Credit, all debit cards are using Credit Card transaction system.  
Shinhan Card
Domestic Card; South Korean domestic transaction system only. Both Credit and Debit Card number starts with 9XXX. 
Visa (includes domestic-only debit card)
Visa Electron
MasterCard
Maestro
JCB
URS (Domestic Credit Card only. JCB handles international transactions.)
BC
BC South Korean domestic card
BC Visa
BC MasterCard
BC Maestro (debit card only)
BC JCB (credit card only)
BC CUP

See also
Economy of South Korea
Shinhan Financial Group
Shinhan Bank
Namdaemun

Homepage
Shinhan Card Homepage

References

Financial services companies of South Korea
Financial services companies established in 2002
2002 establishments in South Korea